Pinther Ridge is an arc-shaped mountain ridge, 6 nautical miles (11 km) long, that is somewhat isolated and mostly snow-covered. It rises above the ice surface at the east margin of the Dyer Plateau of Palmer Land, about 22 nautical miles (41 km) south of the Eternity Range. Mapped by United States Geological Survey (USGS) in 1974. Named by Advisory Committee on Antarctic Names (US-ACAN) for Miklos Pinther, Chief Cartographer of the American Geographical Society in the 1970s, under whose supervision a number of excellent maps of Antarctica have been prepared.

Ridges of Palmer Land